Laura Littlejohn (born 12 July 2004) is a New Zealand swimmer. She competed in the women's 200 metre freestyle event at the 2021 FINA World Swimming Championships (25 m) in Abu Dhabi.

References

External links
 

2004 births
Living people
New Zealand female freestyle swimmers
Place of birth missing (living people)
21st-century New Zealand women